Everywhere may refer to:
 Everywhere (band)
 Everywhere (Roswell Rudd album), 1966
 Everywhere (Gerald Wilson album), 1968
 Everywhere (Tim McGraw album), 1997
 "Everywhere" (Tim McGraw song), title track from the album
 "Everywhere" (Fleetwood Mac song), 1987 
 "Everywhere" (Michelle Branch song), 2001
 Everywhere (Maaya Sakamoto album), 2010
 "Everywhere", the first of three discs from Lupe Fiasco's forthcoming album LupE.N.D.
 Everywhere (video game), an open world video game

See also